Jake LaCava (born January 21, 2001) is an American soccer player who plays as a forward for Major League Soccer club Inter Miami.

Career

Youth
LaCava spent time with academy teams at the Barça Academy in Arizona, LA Galaxy and New York Red Bulls. He also spent time on trial with Danish Superliga side Hobro IK in 2019.

New York Red Bulls II
On July 3, 2020, LaCava signed for USL Championship side New York Red Bulls II. He made his league debut for the club on July 17, 2020, appearing as a 67th-minute substitute in a 1–0 loss to Hartford Athletic. On August 29, 2020, LaCava scored his first two goals as a professional in a 3–2 victory over Loudoun United FC.

On April 30, 2021, LaCava scored his clubs first goal of the season in a 3–2 loss to Hartford Athletic.

Following the 2021 season, LaCava's contract with New York expired.

New York Red Bulls
On January 20, 2022, it was announced that LaCava had signed a one-year MLS contract with the New York Red Bulls, with options for the 2023, 2024, and 2025 seasons.

Tampa Bay Rowdies (loan)
Having signed an MLS contract with the New York Red Bulls, it was announced on January 20, 2022, that LaCava would spend an additional season in USL Championship, on loan to the Tampa Bay Rowdies.

Inter Miami
On November 11, 2022, LaCava was selected in the 2022 MLS Expansion Draft by St. Louis City SC. The club immediately traded him to Inter Miami CF in exchange for $150,000 of General Allocation Money.

Career statistics

References

External links

Jake LaCava at NYRB
Jake LaCava  at USL Championship

2001 births
American soccer players
Association football forwards
Living people
New York Red Bulls II players
People from New Milford, Connecticut
Soccer players from Connecticut
Sportspeople from the New York metropolitan area
USL Championship players
New York Red Bulls players
Tampa Bay Rowdies players
Inter Miami CF players